Wallenius Wilhelmsen Logistics was a privately owned Norwegian/Swedish shipping company, established in 1999 and co-owned by the two shipping companies Wallenius Lines and Wilh. Wilhelmsen.

Overview
Prior to its restructuring and division of its services in 2017 as the Wallenius Wilhelmsen Group, the company offered a range of logistics services, including supply chain management, ocean transportation using Neo-bulk cargo ships, terminal handling, inland distribution and technical services. 

After rebranding and reorganisation, it remains one of the world's largest companies in the transporting of Roll-on/roll-off equipment: automobiles, heavy machinery (mining, construction, farming equipment), yachts, trains, power stations, trailers, Mafi roll trailers and others. 

Headquartered in Oslo and Stockholm, with main regional offices in New York, Tokyo and Melbourne, the company has 8,700 employees worldwide.

In 2017, Wallenius Wilhelmsen Logistics was split into Wallenius Wilhelmsen Ocean and Wallenius Wilhelmsen Solutions in the Wallenius Wilhelmsen Group. The latter provides land-based services to many industries, including the automotive, aerospace, and agricultural machinery sectors, while the former subdivision of the Group manages ocean-bound operations. 

The shipping group currently operates a fleet of 123 vessels.

See also 
Taiko (ship)
MV Tricolor
List of roll-on/roll-off vessel accidents
Wallenius Lines
Wilh. Wilhelmsen
American Roll-on Roll-off Carrier
EUKOR
United European Car Carriers
Nippon Yusen Kaisha

Gallery

References

 
Car carrier shipping companies
Commercial management shipping companies
Transport companies established in 1999
Ro-ro shipping companies
Norwegian companies established in 1999